Senator Holmes may refer to:

Members of the United States Senate
David Holmes (politician) (1769–1832), U.S. Senator from Mississippi from 1820 to 1825
John Holmes (Maine politician) (1773–1843), U.S. Senator from Maine from 1820 to 1827

United States state senate members
David S. Holmes Jr. (1914–1994), Michigan State Senate
Ezekiel Holmes (1801–1865), Maine State Senate
John Bee Holmes (1760–1827), South Carolina State Senate
Linda Holmes (born 1959), Illinois State Senate
Newland H. Holmes (1891–1965), Massachusetts State Senate
Patricia Holmes (politician) (born  1959), Michigan State Senate
Robert D. Holmes (1909–1976), Oregon State Senate
Sybil Holmes (1889–1979), Massachusetts State Senate